Veronika Stampe is an East German retired slalom canoeist who competed in the early 1970s. She won two medals at the 1971 ICF Canoe Slalom World Championships in Meran with a gold in the K-1 team event and a bronze in the K-1 event.

References

East German female canoeists
Living people
Year of birth missing (living people)
Medalists at the ICF Canoe Slalom World Championships